Pullikkaran Staraa is a 2017 Indian Malayalam-language comedy film written and directed by Syamdhar and starring Mammootty, Deepti Sati and Asha Sarath . The film released on 1 September 2017, coinciding with Onam and Bakrid festivals.

Plot 

Rajakumaran (Mammootty), moves to Kochi as an instructor in a teacher's training institute and he meets two women, Manjari (Asha Sarath) and Manjima (Deepti Sati) which changes the turn of his life.

Cast

Mammootty as Rajakumaran
Deepti Sati as Manjima (voice-over by Raveena Ravi)
Asha Sarath as Manjari Anthony, a School teacher
Innocent as Omanakshan Pillai
Sijoy Varghese as Anthony
Vivek Gopan as Vivek
Dileesh Pothan as Kuryachen
Hareesh Perumanna as Bharathan
Pearle Maaney as Angelina
Sohan Seenulal
 Nitha Promy as Deepa teacher
Alencier Ley Lopez as Kumaran, Rajakumaran's father
Maniyanpilla Raju as Murali Nambiar, Manjima's father
Anjali Aneesh as Mayur's wife
Thesni Khan as Vedikettu Mridhula
Sunil Sukhada as Sudhakaran
 Kalabhavan Haneef as teacher

 Emil George

Production

Pullikkaran Staara is the second directorial venture by Syamdhar. The film is produced by B. Rakesh & Francis Kannookadan, under the banner Universal Cinemas in association with FTS FILMS. Mammootty does the role of a teacher trainer who hails from Idukki. Deepti Sati returned after a gap of over 2 years.  Asha Sarath does the second female lead role, that of a teacher. After a short break, actor and parliamentarian Innocent (actor) is shown in a full-length role in the film. The makers announced the title of the film, only after the completion of the shoot.

Release
The film opened in theatres as an Onam-Bakrid release on 1 September 2017. It grossed 95 lakh in the opening day at Kerala box office.

Music
The film features songs composed by M. Jayachandran while the background score is provided by Gopi Sundar. An audio launch function was held on 10 August 2017.

References

External links
 

2010s Malayalam-language films
Indian family films
Indian comedy films
Films shot in Kochi
Films shot in Munnar